The Lepenac is a river in southern Kosovo and northern North Macedonia, a  long left tributary to the Vardar river.

Sirinić 

It flows eastward, into the župa of Sirinić, between the Žar mountain from the north and alongside the northern slopes of the Šar Mountains from the south. From the Šar Mountains it receives many small tributaries, most notably the Suva reka, as it passes next to the villages of Sevce and Jazhincë, the ski resort of Brezovica and a small town and regional center of Štrpce.

The Lepenac continues between the Šar Mountains from the south and Nerodimka mountain from the north, next to the villages of Biti e Poshtëme, Gotovushë, Brod and Doganaj, where the river makes an elbow turn to the south entering the Kosovo field.

Veliko Kosovo and Kaçanik gorge 

For several kilometers the Lepenac flows parallel to the Nerodimka river, flows next to the villages of Kovaçefc and Bob, and receives its major tributary the Nerodimka from the left at the town of Kaçanik, at the beginning of the Kaçanik Gorge.

The gorge, as the narrowest part of the Lepenac river valley, is located between the Sharr Mountains on the west and Skopska Crna Gora on the east and connects the Kosovo field and Skopje depressions. Higher parts of the gorge are actually formed by the ancient outflow of the now extinct lake. The village of Pustenik and small town of Hani I Elezit  are located in the gorge.

Skopje depression 

For the remaining , the Lepenac flows through the low Skopje depression, part of the composite valley of the river Vardar. Immediately entering the Greater Skopje area, it receives several small streams from the left, from the Skopska Crna Gora mountain.

Characteristics 

It is not navigable.

The Kačanik gorge is a route for both the road and the railway Kraljevo-Priština-Skopje.

The river has a potential for hydroelectrical production, but even though being a part of the former Ibar-Lepenac Hydrosystem project, it is not much used, either for energy production or irrigation.

The Lepenac was a part of the artificial bifurcation, as the Nerodimka connected both Lepenac and Sitnica rivers via a canal, thus connecting Aegean and Black Sea drainage basins, but the canal was covered after World War II.

Notes and references 

Notes:

References:

 Mala Prosvetina Enciklopedija, Third edition (1985); Prosveta; 
 Jovan Đ. Marković (1990): Enciklopedijski geografski leksikon Jugoslavije; Svjetlost-Sarajevo; 

Rivers of Kosovo
Rivers of North Macedonia
Geography of Ferizaj District
Geography of Prizren District